Beschendorf is a municipality and a town in the district of Ostholstein, in Schleswig-Holstein, Germany.

References

Municipalities in Schleswig-Holstein
Ostholstein